Sevier Nunatak is a nunatak lying southeast of Richter Peaks, rising to about 1,000 m at the south end of the Walton Mountains, situated in the central portion of Alexander Island, Antarctica. The nunatak was named by the Advisory Committee on Antarctic Names for Lieutenant Commander Moses T. Sevier, U. S. Navy, Assistant Chief of Staff for Supply and Logistics, U. S. Naval Support Force, Antarctica, "Operation Deepfreeze", 1968 to 1972; Assistant Supply Officer, Squadron VX-6, "Operation Deepfreeze", 1956 to 1958.

See also

 Coal Nunatak
 Emerald Nunatak
 Hesperus Nunatak

Nunataks of Alexander Island